Death of Evil is a 2009 direct-to-video supernatural horror film, written, directed by and starring Damian Chapa. The film revolves around a Native American man who must fight off an evil plot by his pregnant wife's family line to corrupt his unborn child. It was released in the United States in September 2009, and in the Netherlands in October 2010.

Plot
David and Julie are expecting their first child, but David discovers that her family is a long line of devil worshippers. They plan to offer up the baby as a sacrifice to Satan to prolong their power and lifespans, and David must use the psychic and spiritual powers within himself to save them all.

Cast

References

External links
 

2009 films
2009 horror films
Religious horror films
American supernatural horror films
2000s English-language films
Films directed by Damian Chapa
2000s American films